Kofanovka , rural localities in Russia, may refer to:

 Kofanovka, Fatezhsky District, Kursk Oblast, a village
 Kofanovka, Medvensky District, Kursk Oblast, a khutor